Richard Barrie Dobson  (3 November 1931 – 29 March 2013) was an English historian, who was a leading authority on the legend of Robin Hood as well as a scholar of ecclesiastical and Jewish history. He served as Professor of Medieval History at the University of Cambridge from 1988 to 1999.

Early life
Dobson was born on 3 November 1931 in Stockton-on-Tees. As his father worked for the Great Western Railway of Brazil his spent his early years in South America. The family returned to England and he spent his boyhood living in Mickleton, North Riding of Yorkshire. He was educated at Barnard Castle School, a private school in Barnard Castle, Teesdale.

Following his schooling, he was called up to the British Army as part of National Service. He saw active service during the Malayan Emergency. Upon completion of his National Service, in 1951 he matriculated into Wadham College, University of Oxford. He graduated with a first-class Bachelor of Arts degree. He then joined Magdalen College, Oxford, where he completed a Doctor of Philosophy (DPhil) degree. His thesis was titled The Priory of Durham Priory in the Time of John Wessington, Prior 1416–1446 and was completed in 1962.

Academic career
Dobson lectured in medieval history at the University of St Andrews from 1958 to 1964. He then joined the University of York as a history lecturer in 1964. He rose through the ranks in his department becoming a reader and then professor of history in 1977. In 1984, he was appointed deputy vice-chancellor and thereby becoming the second most senior academic of the university. In 1988, he moved to the University of Cambridge to take up the post of Professor of Medieval History. He also became a fellow of Christ's College.

He also held a number of senior positions outside of university. He was president of the Surtees Society from 1987 to 2002, president of the Jewish Historical Society of England from 1990 to 1991 and of the Ecclesiastical History Society from 1991 to 1992. He was one of the founding members of the York Archaeological Trust in 1972. From 1990 to 1996, he was the trust's chairman.

Later life
Dobson died on 29 March 2013 at his home in York aged 81 years. His funeral service was held at the York Unitarian Chapel on 16 April.

Personal life
Dobson married Narda Leon in 1959. They had met at the University of Oxford while they were both studying there. They had two children.

Honours
Dobson was elected to the fellowship of a number of learned societies: the Royal Historical Society in 1972, the Society of Antiquaries in 1979, and the British Academy in 1988.

Works
 Durham Priory, 1400-1450 (1973)
 The Peasants' Revolt of 1381 (1970)
 The Jews of Medieval York and the Massacre of March 1190 (1974)
 Rymes of Robyn Hood: An Introduction to the English Outlaw (with John Taylor) (1976)
 The Church, Politics and Patronage in the Fifteenth Century (1984)
 Preserving the perishable (1991)
 Clifford's Tower and the Jews of Medieval York (1995)
 Church and Society in the Medieval North of England (1996)
 ‘The Northern Provinces in the Later Middle Ages’, Northern History, xlii, 51. (2005)
 The Jewish Communities of Medieval England (2010)

References

External links
Obituary - The Telegraph
Obituary - The Times
Obituary - The Guardian

1931 births
2013 deaths
20th-century English historians
British medievalists
People from Stockton-on-Tees
Fellows of the Royal Historical Society
Fellows of the Society of Antiquaries of London
Fellows of the British Academy
Academics of the University of St Andrews
Academics of the University of York
Fellows of Christ's College, Cambridge
British Army personnel of the Malayan Emergency
People educated at Barnard Castle School
Alumni of Wadham College, Oxford
Professors of Medieval History (Cambridge)
Presidents of the Ecclesiastical History Society
Surtees Society